Chionanthus crispus grows as a tree up to  tall, with a trunk diameter of up to .  The bark is grey. The flowers are white or purple. The specific epithet crispus is from the Latin meaning "curled", referring to the petals. Habitat is primary forest from sea-level to  altitude. C. crispus is endemic to Borneo.

References

crispus
Endemic flora of Borneo
Trees of Borneo
Plants described in 1981